Tutta la città canta is a 1945 Italian musical-comedy film directed by Riccardo Freda.

Cast

Production

Pre-production
Tutta la città canta was director Riccardo Freda's third film as a director. The film was influenced by Hollywood films with the idea of putting a "revue" film on which featured the period's major singers and film stars, similar to that of The Hollywood Revue of 1929. Among the people in the film included Nino Taranto, a Neapolitan stage and radio comedian, Natalino Otto, a jazz singer, and singer and actress Vivi Gioi, and the three Bono brothers: Gianni, Vittorio and Luigi who were comedians somewhat similar to the Marx Brothers.

During the script writing period, Freda met the then cartoonist Federico Fellini who was 23 years old at the time. According to Freda, Fellini was introduced to him by Vittorio Metz and took part in the screenwriting process, which Freda described Fellini's contributions as being "scrippling on sheet after sheet of paper with a pen. Thos were neither suggestions nor notes; Federico just kept drawing, and he drew huge naked women, real giangtesses, I think paroxsymally fat women were one of his hidden obsessions. Then, probably rightly so, he disappeared."

Recording music for the film had to be done discreetly as by 1938 in Italy, Jazz was labeled as "Negroid music" an banished from the radio and American music was forbidden by 1940. When performing songs such as "Louisiana blues", guards were placed outside the recording studio to make sure Blackshirts would not catch them.

Filming
Shooting on the film began in 1943 at Pisorno studios in Tirrenia under the title 6 x 8 / 48, based on one of the musical numbers in the film. Within a few weeks, filming was cancelled due to the escalation of World War II in Italy. Production on the film only began again on in 1945. Much of the cast was unavailable at the timeand the Vivi Gioi had gained a significant amount of weight. Freda chose to simply replace actors with doubles and used quick cutting to hide the actors being different from the audience.

Release
The film's title was changed to Tutta la città canta, a title that echos the film The Whole Town's Talking. It was distributed in Italy by Effebi and was released on 15 August 1945. The film had little success in Italy as jazz music was no longer a hot topic as it had become legal once again. Freda spoke negatively about the film, stating that it was "a terrible turnip of a film" and that "the attempt at jazz was amusing. It was a 'spaghetti musical"

The film was restored by the Cineteca of Milan and shown as part of a retrospective on Italian comedy at the 67th Venice International Film Festival in 2010.

References

Bibliography

External links

1945 films
1945 musical comedy films
Italian musical comedy films
1940s Italian-language films
Italian black-and-white films
Films directed by Riccardo Freda
1940s Italian films